Ahmedabad is a taluka of Ahmedabad District, India.

References

Talukas of Gujarat
Ahmedabad district